Edmund Dawson Ahmoah is an Anglican bishop  in Ghana: he is the current Bishop of Dunkwa-on-Offin.

References

Anglican bishops of Dunkwa-on-Offin
21st-century Anglican bishops in Ghana
Year of birth missing (living people)
Living people
Place of birth missing (living people)